Bernard Schmetz (21 March 1904 – 11 June 1966) was a French fencer. He won a gold, silver and bronze medal at three different Olympic Games in the team épée.

References

External links
 

1904 births
1966 deaths
French male épée fencers
Olympic fencers of France
Fencers at the 1928 Summer Olympics
Fencers at the 1932 Summer Olympics
Fencers at the 1936 Summer Olympics
Olympic gold medalists for France
Olympic silver medalists for France
Olympic bronze medalists for France
Olympic medalists in fencing
Sportspeople from Orléans
Medalists at the 1928 Summer Olympics
Medalists at the 1932 Summer Olympics
Medalists at the 1936 Summer Olympics